Kevin Lawrence Stefanski  (born May 8, 1982) is an American football coach who is the head coach for the Cleveland Browns of the National Football League (NFL). He began his NFL career as an assistant coach for the Minnesota Vikings from 2006 to 2019 and was the offensive coordinator during his final two seasons. Stefanski left Minnesota to become the Browns' head coach in 2020, where he led the team to their first playoff appearance since 2002. He was named NFL Coach of the Year after the season, becoming the first Browns coach to receive the honor since 1976 and the first following the franchise's 1999 return as an expansion team.

Early life and playing career
Stefanski graduated from St. Joseph's Preparatory School in 2000 and the University of Pennsylvania in 2004. Stefanski played defensive back while at Penn, being named the Quakers Freshman of the Year in 2000. He was part of the only undefeated Penn team of the decade and was twice an All-Ivy League selection.

Coaching career

Minnesota Vikings assistant
Stefanski joined the Minnesota Vikings in 2006 as an assistant to then-head coach Brad Childress. In 2009, he was promoted to assistant quarterbacks' coach, where he would serve until the 2013 season and had coached quarterbacks such as Brett Favre and Christian Ponder. Despite the Vikings' ups and downs during his tenure, Stefanski survived 3 coaching changes (Childress, Leslie Frazier, and Mike Zimmer).

In 2017, after the termination of Scott Turner, Stefanski was promoted to coach the Vikings quarterbacks, where he helped transform the Vikings into the NFL's 10th-highest scoring offense. Quarterback Case Keenum had his best season under Stefanski, throwing 22 touchdown passes and only seven interceptions. He previously worked with the running backs in 2016 and the tight ends in 2014 and 2015.

After the 2017 season, the New York Giants requested to interview and hire Stefanski as their new offensive coordinator, but Vikings denied the request.

After offensive coordinator John DeFilippo was fired following a 21–7 loss to the Seattle Seahawks, Stefanski was named interim offensive coordinator. On January 9, 2019, Stefanski was promoted to full-time offensive coordinator.

Cleveland Browns
On January 13, 2020, Stefanski signed a five-year contract to become the 18th head coach of the Cleveland Browns, two days after the Minnesota Vikings lost in the NFC playoffs. On September 13, 2020, Stefanski lost his head coaching debut to the Baltimore Ravens by a score of 38–6. The loss marked the 16th consecutive Week 1 without a win for the Browns. On September 17, Stefanski recorded his first career win as a head coach in the 35–30 win against the Cincinnati Bengals.

On December 6, Stefanski became the first Browns head coach since Romeo Crennel in 2007 to lead the franchise to a winning season, securing his ninth win with a 41–35 victory over the Tennessee Titans. Stefanski led the Browns to a 11–5 record, finishing third in the AFC North and clinching the Browns' first playoff berth since 2002. It was also the franchise's best record since their 1999 return. However, Stefanski tested positive for COVID-19 on the Tuesday before the game, preventing him from coaching the wild card game against the Pittsburgh Steelers. The Browns went on to defeat the Steelers 48–37, which was their first playoff win since 1994, as well as their first since their 1999 re-activation. He returned to the team on January 14. The Browns lost the following week to the Kansas City Chiefs in the AFC Divisional Round, 22–17. For his work during the 2020 season, Stefanski was named as the Associated Press NFL Coach of the Year. He was the first Browns coach to receive the honor since Forrest Gregg in 1976, in addition to being the first after Cleveland's return in 1999.

Head coaching record

Personal life
Stefanski and his wife Michelle have three children together. He is the son of NBA executive Ed Stefanski.

References

External links
 Cleveland Browns profile

1982 births
Living people
American football defensive backs
Cleveland Browns head coaches
Minnesota Vikings coaches
Penn Quakers football players
Sportspeople from Philadelphia
Coaches of American football from Pennsylvania
Players of American football from Philadelphia
American people of Polish descent